Side A is a Filipino pop band formed in 1985. They gained recognition in the Philippine music scene in the late 1980s through to the early 2000s. They are best known for their hit single "Forevermore." Side A achieved major commercial success during the 1990s. In 1993, the group's third album went triple platinum and in the mid-1990s, Side A garnered two Awit Awards, the Philippines' equivalent of the Grammys.

History

Dubbed as the "Philippines' premiere band" and the local version of the band Toto, Side A was founded in 1985 by the brothers Rodel and Naldy Gonzalez, Joey Benin, Kelly Badon, Mar Dizon and Pido Lalimarmo. The band released its eponymous debut album in 1989. The band was first managed by the Christian-oriented artist management company called Artistation Inc., owned by the late Wyngard Tracy.

Side A's eponymous debut album included their first hit single "Eva Marie" which paved the way for their illustrious recording career. Classic Side A songs such as "Windows of Our Souls" and "'Di Pa Huli" can be found on the album. The uptempo "'Di Pa Huli" catapulted the band into the mainstream. Instead of being written as "Side B", the B-side of their albums were written as "Side A too".

Shortly after the success of their debut album, Rodel Gonzalez left for the band Second Wind. Pido Lalimarmo and Mar Dizon left in 1990 to form Artstart. Lalimarmo and Dizon remained with Artstart until 1994 when Lalimarmo united with Eva Marie Poon (sister of Richard Poon) to form Take One and Dizon joining Parliament Syndicate.

Second lineup
Side A's second album, The White Album, also their debut release under Vicor Music, earned double and triple platinum status for its sales. One of the biggest hits included on the album is "Hold On", featuring new lead vocalist Joey Generoso and new drummer Ernie Severino completing and forming the band's long-running line-up.

The Blue Album, their second album under Vicor, also went double and triple platinum. The album features a cover version of Labuyo's "Tuloy Pa Rin Ako" which was recorded live at the Music Hall, one of the premiere lounges in Manila. The album cover sports exactly the same design as the White Album with the embossed Side A logo, only this time in blue.

In 1995, the album By Your Side under Warner reached gold status. The band won two Awit Awards, namely Best Performance by a Group for "By Your Side" and Best Jazz Performance with vocals for "True Love Can Always Wait". It was also the only album they released internationally with two additional singles: "Forevermore" and a cover of the Joey Albert song, "Tell Me". This album also commemorated Side A's 10 years in the music industry.

Side A held a 10th anniversary concert at the Cuneta Astrodome in Pasay and a live recording of the show was released titled Side A Live! The 10th Anniversary Concert which went triple platinum. This album contained cover versions of international and local OPM love songs. It includes the Joey Benin-written Janno Gibbs original "I Believe in Dreams", as well as a version of James Taylor's "Your Smiling Face" in which all of the band members could be heard singing solo parts.

In 1997, the album Year 12 was released and was certified gold. The album features a collaboration of international songwriters including Sharon Cuneta. It commemorated their twelfth year as a band.

In September 1998, Side A's offering for the Philippine Centennial Year, the album Ang Ating Awitin was released. Advance orders of the album guaranteed a gold album award for the group in its first week of release. It includes a groovier version of the Hotdog song, "Manila".

In 1999, the band released Remember December, their first and only Christmas album, and in 2000 the album Will I Ever was released with its carrier single, "Will I Ever". The album proved to be a minor success.

A compilation of all the band's greatest hits from 1985 to 2001 was released in the album The Platinum Collection. It contains new versions of their old hits.

In 2003, the band released the album "titanium"

In 2005, Kelly Badon left the band to form The Kelly Badon Project with former members of Freeverse. Badon was replaced by former Take One guitarist Leevon Cailao (making him the youngest member of the band). His debut with the band features him singing Fra Lippo Lippi's "Later" on their 2005 Gig: All Hits Live (at Bagaberde) album. The live album had minimal success.

Joey Benin left Side A in 2007. He currently tends a fish farm and a developing natural organic farmland in Silay, Negros Occidental with his wife and kids. He was replaced by Ned Esguerra, former Freeverse member.

Joey Generoso left Side A in 2015 to pursue a solo career under the name Joey G.

2020–present
In September 2020, the original lineup - the Gonzalez brothers, Joey Benin, Kelly Badon, Mar Dizon and Pido Lalimarmo - released a re-recording of "'Di Pa Huli" via Patreon. The single is part of the original lineup's reunion project Side A Redux: First Album, consisting of new versions of songs from their eponymous 1989 debut album as well as new material. The original lineup staged an online benefit concert titled "Calesa: Side A Redux" on January 30, 2021.

In January 2021, the current lineup released a new single "Until You".

Members

Current members
 Naldy Gonzalez - keyboard (1985–present)
 Ernie Severino - drums (1990–present)
 Leevon Cailao - lead guitar (2005–present)
 Ned Esguerra - bass guitar (2008–present)
 Yubs Esperat - lead vocals, guitar (2008–present)

Former members
 Rodel Gonzalez - lead vocals, saxophone (1985-1990, 2020 reunion)
 Pido Lalimarmo - guitar, vocals (1985-1990, 2020 reunion)
 Mar Dizon - drums (1985-1990, 2020 reunion)
 Benjamin "Bagets" Mendez (1988-1992)
 Kelly Badon - lead guitar, vocals (1985-2005, 2020 reunion)
 Joey Benin - bass guitar, vocals (1985-2008, 2020 reunion)
 Joey Generoso - lead vocals, guitar (1990-2015; brother of TV director Pinggoy Generoso)

Discography

Studio albums

Compilation albums

Live albums

Christmas album

Singles and EPs
1994: "So Many Questions" - won the 1994 Awit Award for Best Ballad Recording and Best Performance by a Group
1995: Forevermore - first EP which sold more than 90,000 copies; it contains the single "Forevermore" which won them the 1996 Awit Award for Best Performance by a Group for the third consecutive year and Song of the Year. It also included "Tell Me". "Forevermore" was also covered by Regine Velasquez-Alcasid in 2004 for the GMA drama series "Forever in My Heart", American singer David Archuleta from his album of the same title in 2012, and covered by Juris Fernandez-Lim in 2015 for the ABS-CBN teleserye of the same title.
1996: "Until Then" - written by Gary Valenciano and popularized by a Lux Super Rich shampoo commercial; a year later in 1997 it was covered later by Gary Valenciano for his greatest hits album. It was also covered by Jed Madela.

References

1985 establishments in the Philippines
Filipino contemporary R&B musical groups
Filipino pop music groups
Filipino rock music groups
MCA Music Inc. (Philippines) artists
Musical groups established in 1985
Musical groups from Metro Manila
Vicor Music artists
Viva Records (Philippines) artists
Warner Music Group artists